Sissiborgaon is a village and tehsil of Dhemaji district, Assam state, India. Sissiborgaon is a populated developed village.

Location

According to Census 2011 information the location code or village code of Sissiborgaon village is 288939. Sissiborgaon village is located in Sissibargaon Tehsil of Dhemaji district in Assam, India. It is situated 22 km away from district headquarter. Sissiborgaon is the sub-district headquarter of Sissiborgaon village. As per 2009 stats, Sissiborgaon village is also a gram panchayat.

Sengajan multimodal waterways terminal 
Sengajan multimodal waterways terminal on Brahmaputra National Waterway 2 in Sissiborgaon tehsil is part of Bharatmala and Sagarmala projects. There are 19 National Waterways for the Northeast connectivity.

Banking service
State Bank Of India
Assam Gramin Vikash Bank

Education

Colleges

Sissiborgaon College
Sissiborgaon Junior College
Sissiborgaon Science College

Schools

Sissiborgaon M.V. School.
Sissiborgaon Higher Secondary School.
Sissiborgaon girls High School
Sissiborgaon girls M.E. School
Sankardev Sishu/Vidya Niketan, Sissiborgaon
Vivekananda Kendra Vidyalaya
Sissiborgaon English Academy
Gelua M.P. High School
Mising Janajatiyo M.E. School

Religion

A large majority of the people in the region follow Hinduism, while there are only 3% of Muslims and 1% of people following other faiths.

Population

The Sissiborgaon village has population of 728 of which 344 are males while 384 are females as per Population Census 2011. 
In Sissiborgaon village population of children with age 0-6 is 102 which makes up 14.01% of total population of village. Average Sex Ratio of Sissiborgaon village is 1116  which is higher than Assam state average of 958. Child Sex Ratio for the Sissiborgaon as per census is 1217, higher than Assam average of 962.

Transportation

Road

The National Highway 15 passes through Sissiborgaon connecting it to Baihata Chariali and Rupai. There are also many small paths within this tehsil.

Railway
There are two railway stations in Sissiborgaon. The old one is situated in Jonai railway track and new one is situated in Bogibeel railway track.

References

Villages in Dhemaji district